Sweet Valley may refer to:

Sweet Valley, Pennsylvania, an unincorporated community
Sweet Valley High, a series of novels
Sweet Valley (music group), a music duo in Los Angeles
"Sweet Valley", a 1998 song by American R&B singer Eboni Foster